Kings Creek is a creek in eastern Ontario, Canada. It is a left tributary of the Mississippi River (Ontario) and flows into that river system at Mississippi Lake.

See also
List of rivers of Ontario

References

Rivers of Lanark County